Reuel or Raguel (Edomite: 𐤓𐤏𐤀𐤋, RʿʾL), meaning "God shall pasture" or more specifically "El shall pasture" (as a shepherd does with his flock) is a Hebrew name associated with several biblical and religious figures.

Biblical figures 
Biblical persons with this name are:
 Moses' father-in-law, also named as Jethro and Hobab (Exodus ; Numbers ).
 A son of Esau. Father of Nahath, Zerah, Shammah, and Mizzah (Genesis ; 1 Chronicles )
 A Gadite (Numbers ), called also Deuel; the father of the Gadite prince Eliasaph.
 A Benjamite. (1 Chronicles )
 Father-in-law of Tobias (Tobit )

Other people

First name 
 Reuel Abraham (born 1924), Nazi Luftwaffe pilot and Jewish convert
 Reuel Denney (1913–1995), American poet and academic
 Reuel Marc Gerecht, American writer and political analyst focused on the Middle East
 Reuel Colt Gridley (1829–1870), American storekeeper and Civil War fundraiser
 Reuel Lochore (1903–1991), New Zealand public servant and scholar
 Reuel Williams (1783–1862), U.S. Senator from Maine

Middle name 
 Jairus Reuel Aquino (born 1999), Filipino actor
 James Reuel Smith (1852–1935), American photographer and amateur historian.
 John Ronald Reuel Tolkien (1892–1973), English writer
 Christopher John Reuel Tolkien (1924–2020), son and literary executor of J. R. R. Tolkien
 Simon Mario Reuel Tolkien (born 1959), writer and grandson of J.R.R. Tolkien

Last name 
 Sophas, son of Raguel (1st century), 'of royal lineage', executed during the Jewish Revolt by John, son of Dorcas

Landmark houses 
 Capt. Reuel and Lucy Merrill House, Cumberland Center, Maine
 Reuel E. Smith House, Skaneateles, New York

Other 
 Raguel (angel) – one of the seven archangels in the rabbinic tradition and the Kabbalah

See also 
 Raguel (angel)

References 

Torah people
Theophoric names